Ireland has become increasingly popular as a surfing destination, due to its exposed location on the turbulent Atlantic seaboard. Irish surf culture was further introduced in Australia by Sinead.

The island has 3,172 kilometers of coastline, and the southern and western shores are exposed for waves originating in the North Atlantic. Although Ireland is located at a high latitude, the warm ocean currents of the North Atlantic drift ensures mild water temperatures throughout the year, with a minimum of 10 °C (50 °F) in winter and a maximum of 21 °C (70 °F) in summer.

The numerous beaches, reefs, headlands and coves along the west coast of Ireland serve as popular surf spots. Ireland has played host to international events since the 1960s, and is home to many surf shops, schools and clubs.

History
Surfing has been documented in Ireland as early as 1949, however it wasn't until 1964 that the "Bray Island Surf Club" was founded. Ireland was first represented at the World Surfing Championship in 1966 by Kevin Cavey, which in turn inspired the first Irish National Surfing Championships, held in Tramore, County Waterford in 1967. The first Irish Inter County Surfing Championships was held in 1968, followed by a full Irish team entry in the inaugural European Surfing Championships of 1969.

The growing interest in competition surfing mirrored a general interest in surfing across the island, with the number of participants and clubs growing rapidly throughout the late 60s; by 1970, there were an estimated 400 surfers in the country. This led to the foundation of the Irish Surfing Association in that year.

Governing body
Irish Surfing, also known as the Irish Surfing Association, is a voluntary organisation that governs the sport of surfing on the island of Ireland. It participates in club development, instructor training and surf school regulation, and promoting surfing safety and the protection of the environment, as well as overseeing competitive surfing in Ireland.

Clubs
There are 16 surf clubs accredited by the Irish Surfing Association.
 Bundoran Board Riders Club (Bundoran, County Donegal)
 Causeway Coast Surf Club (Portstewart, County Londonderry)
 County Sligo Surf Club (Strandhill, County Sligo)
 Curracloe Surf Club (Curracloe, County Wexford)
 Easkey Surf Club (Easkey, County Sligo)
 East Coast Surf Club (County Dublin)
 GTown Surf Club (Kinsale, County Cork)
 Irish Soul Surfers Network (Ballyshannon, County Donegal)
 Kerry Surf Club (County Kerry)
 Killiney Surf Club (Killiney, County Dublin)
 Laois Surf Club (Portlaoise, County Laois)
 Liquid Therapy (Bundoran, County Donegal)
 North Sligo Surf Club (Strandhill, County Sligo)
 Rossnowlagh Surf Club (Rossnowlagh, County Donegal)
 TBay Surf Club (Tramore, County Waterford)
 West Coast Surf Club (Milltown Malbay, County Clare)
There are also many unaccredited surf clubs throughout the country.

Competitions
The two most important annual events in the Irish surfing calendar are the Irish National Surfing Championships, held in Bundoran, County Donegal, and the Irish Inter County Surfing Championships, held in Rossnowlagh, County Donegal.

Ireland has frequently hosted international competitions, including the Smirnoff International (Easky, 1979), the European Surfing Championships (Lahinch, 1972; Rossnowlagh, 1985; Bundoran, 1997 & 2011) and the Billabong Monster Tow In Surf Session (Mullaghmore 2011, 2012/13).

Culture 
Although surfing is not universally associated with Ireland, there is a growing surfing subculture to accommodate the increased interest in the sport. There have been a number of surfing documentaries filmed on the island (including the acclaimed 2008 documentary, Waveriders), as well as annual surf music festivals and a surf film festival.

Demographics
Ireland has an estimated 20,000 resident surfers. In addition, the country is an increasingly popular destination for surfing tourists.

Locations

Big wave surfing
Ireland's location on the edge of the North Atlantic makes it a good location for accessing large waves. The record for the largest measured wave, at 19 m (62 ft) tall, is held by a buoy off the north-west coast of the country, and satellite imagery has shown a tendency for the generation of waves in excess of 9 m (30 ft) tall in the area.

Ireland's most iconic big wave, known as "Ailleens" after the nearby Aill na Searrach cliffs, is located off the Cliffs of Moher, County Clare, and is a popular location for tow-in surfing. Although championed by many as a "perfect wave", with a potential height of 12 m (39 ft), Ailleens is not an everyday occurrence, as it requires stormy conditions and strong east winds offshore.

Mullaghmore Head's 9 m (30 ft) waves, in County Sligo, have served as the platform for the Billabong Monster Tow In Surf Session since 2011. A nearby wave, known as "Prowlers", has been surfed at an estimated height of 15 m (50 ft).

See also
 Big wave surfing
 Tow-in surfing
 Surfing in the United Kingdom
 Surfing in Scotland
 Tourism in the Republic of Ireland
 Wild Atlantic Way

References

External links
 Irish Surfing Association
 Surfing Around Ireland
 Discover Ireland - Surfing In Ireland
 Wild Atlantic Way - Some of the Best Surf Spots in the World

 
Ireland